The 2013 WGC-Accenture Match Play Championship was the 15th WGC-Accenture Match Play Championship, played February  at The Golf Club at Dove Mountain in Marana, Arizona, northwest of Tucson.

Matt Kuchar won his first WGC event, 2&1 over runner-up Hunter Mahan, the defending champion. This was the first of four World Golf Championships in 2013. Weather delays due to snow disrupted the schedule.

Past champions in the field

Course

 The only yardage change from 2012 was the shortening of the 11th hole from 659 to 601 yards, as it had been in 2011.

Brackets
The championship is a single elimination match play event. The field consists of the top 64 players available from the Official World Golf Ranking as of the February 10 ranking, seeded according to the February 17 rankings.

Phil Mickelson (ranked 10 as of February 10) chose not to enter and was replaced by Shane Lowry (ranked 65 as of February 10). Brandt Snedeker (ranked 4) withdrew with a rib injury and was replaced by Freddie Jacobson (ranked 66 as of February 10). As of February 17, Lowry became the bottom seed (ranked 68).

Russell Henley was the only player competing in his first WGC event.

Weather delay
Snow forced the cancellation of play on Wednesday afternoon. None of the first round matches were completed and ten of the matches had not yet started when play was halted. Almost two inches of snow covered the course, practice putting green and the driving range.

Overnight snow caused another delay on Thursday and play did not resume until 1pm local time. At the close of play, 2 of the 32 first round matches were still not completed: Carl Pettersson was 1up on Rickie Fowler after 17 holes while Gonzalo Fernández-Castaño and Francesco Molinari were all square after 15 holes. The revised schedule involves completing the second round on Friday with the third and fourth rounds on Saturday.

Bobby Jones bracket
Shane Lowry became the first 64th seed to reach the third round in the 15-year history of the championship. The three previous 64th seeds to defeat the number 1 seed have all lost in the second round.

Ben Hogan bracket

Gary Player bracket

Sam Snead bracket

Final Four

Scorecard
Final match

Source:

Breakdown by country

Prize money breakdown

 Source:

References

External links

Coverage on the European Tour's official site

WGC Match Play
Golf in Arizona
WGC-Accenture Match Play Championship
WGC-Accenture Match Play Championship
WGC-Accenture Match Play
WGC-Accenture Match Play Championship